Gitra Yuda Furton (born 7 April 1993) is an Indonesian professional footballer who plays as a defender for Liga 2 club PSKC Cimahi.

Career

Semen Padang
Gitra Yuda is a Semen Padang U-21 player and moreover, he managed to bring Semen Padang U-21 won in the Indonesia Super League U-21 for the first time in this year after defeating Sriwijaya FC U-21.

In 2015, he joined the senior squad of Semen Padang F.C. in 2015 Indonesia Super League, wearing jersey number 5.

PS TNI
Gitra joined PS TNI for the 2016 Indonesia Soccer Championship A.

Honours

Club
Semen Padang U-21
 Indonesia Super League U-21: 2014

References

External links
 
 Gitra Yuda Furton at Liga Indonesia

1993 births
Living people
People from Padang
Indonesian footballers
Association football defenders
Semen Padang F.C. players
PS TIRA players
Persik Kediri players
Liga 2 (Indonesia) players
Sportspeople from West Sumatra